Antonio Pavić (born 18 November 1994) is a Croatian professional footballer who plays as a left-back for Velež Mostar.

Career
He also played for Macedonian First Football League club Shkëndija.

References

External links

Antonio Pavić at Sofascore

1994 births
Living people
Footballers from Frankfurt
Association football fullbacks
Croatian footballers
Croatia youth international footballers
Croatia under-21 international footballers
NK Osijek players
FC Koper players
NK Istra 1961 players
FK Željezničar Sarajevo players
KF Shkëndija players
Gżira United F.C. players
FK Velež Mostar players
Croatian Football League players
Slovenian PrvaLiga players
Premier League of Bosnia and Herzegovina players
Macedonian First Football League players
Maltese Premier League players
Croatian expatriate footballers
Croatian expatriate sportspeople in Slovenia
Expatriate footballers in Slovenia
Croatian expatriate sportspeople in Bosnia and Herzegovina
Expatriate footballers in Bosnia and Herzegovina
Croatian expatriate sportspeople in North Macedonia
Expatriate footballers in North Macedonia
Expatriate footballers in Malta
Croatian expatriate sportspeople in Malta